Vakkom Purushothaman (born 12 April 1928) is an Indian politician who served as the Governor of Mizoram from 2011 to 2014,  Former Speaker of Kerala, state minister and former Lt. Governor of Andaman and Nicobar.

Early life
Vakkom B. Purushothaman  -    a veteran Congress leader and advocate, was born at Vakkom near Trivandrum, the capital of Travancore, on 12 April 1928 as the eldest son of Bhanu Panicker and Bhavani and grand son of Sri. Pappu Tharakan, a notable businessman in Travancore.

Beginning his political life as an active worker of the Students' Congress in 1946, he became a member of Vakkom Panchayat in 1953. Later, he served as President of the District Congress Committee, Thiruvananthapuram and the General Secretary and Vice–President of the Kerala Pradesh Congress Committee. He has been a member of All India Congress Committee for over 35 years.

Political life
Vakkom Purushothaman was elected to the Kerala Legislative Assembly in 1970, 1977, 1980 and 1982 from Attingal Constituency. From 1971 to 1977, he held the portfolio of Agriculture and Labour in the Ministry headed by C. Achutha Menon. From 1980 to 1981, he was the Minister for Health and Tourism in the Nayanar Ministry. He served as Speaker of the Kerala Legislative Assembly from 1982 to 1984 and then served for two terms as a Member of parliament, Lok Sabha, 1984-1991, during which time he was also Chairman of the Committee on Public Undertakings and the Committee on Subordinate Legislation of Parliament. He was the Chairman of the Consultative Committee of Experts to the Inter Parliamentary Union for five years.

In 1993-1996, he served as the Lieutenant Governor of the Andaman and Nicobar Islands. In 1996, he lost in the Kerala Legislative Assembly election Attingal. He was elected from Attingal in 2001 and became the Speaker for a second time, holding office from 2001 to 2004. In 2004 he was made the Minister for Finance and Excise in the Oommen Chandy led UDF government and he briefly officiated as Chief Minister in 2006.

Governor of Mizoram
On 26 August 2011 President Pratibha Patil appointed Vakkom B. Purushothaman as the new Governor of Mizoram in place of Madan Mohan Lakhera. Vakkom B. Purushothaman was sworn in as the 18th Governor of Mizoram on 2 September 2011. He resigned on 11 July 2014 from his post due to his transfer to Nagaland.

Personal life
Vakkom Purushothaman married his childhood sweetheart Lilly Purushothaman, and they have two sons and one daughter - Binu Purushothaman, Dr.Bindu Purushothaman. His elder son Biju died on 18 January 2012 after prolonged illness. Biju's death devastated him very much, but he never went to extreme grief.

References

1928 births
Living people
Governors of Mizoram
Lieutenant governors of the Andaman and Nicobar Islands
Malayali politicians
Politicians from Thiruvananthapuram
Speakers of the Kerala Legislative Assembly
Indian National Congress politicians from Kerala
Kerala MLAs 1977–1979
Kerala MLAs 1982–1987
Kerala MLAs 1970–1977
Kerala MLAs 1980–1982
Kerala MLAs 2001–2006
Indian National Congress (U) politicians